Kishan Choudhary (born 22 December 1981) is an Indian first-class cricketer who represented Rajasthan. He made his first-class debut for Rajasthan in the 2002-03 Ranji Trophy on 9 November 2002.

References

External links
 

1981 births
Living people
Indian cricketers
Rajasthan cricketers